Jennens is a surname.  Notable people with the name include:

Charles Jennens (1700 – 20 November 1773), English landowner and patron of the arts
William Jennens (1701–1798), English financier
Aaron Jennens (fl. 1815–1864), a partner in papier-mâché producers Jennens and Bettridge
David Jennens (1929 – 2000), English rower